Baldomero Pedro "Merito" Acosta Fernández (May 19, 1896 – November 17, 1963) was an outfielder in Major League Baseball who played five seasons for the Philadelphia Athletics and Washington Senators.

Acosta played winter baseball in the Cuban League from 1913 to 1925 and was also a long-time manager and part-owner of the Havana Cubans.  In the 1918/19 season, Acosta made an unassisted triple play while playing center field. With the bases loaded, he sprinted in to catch the ball, then continued to touch second base before the runner could return and tagged the runner from first base. In his first season as a manager, 1922/23, he led a brand new franchise, Marianao, to a championship. Acosta was elected to the Cuban Baseball Hall of Fame in 1955.

Notes

References
.

External links

1896 births
1963 deaths
Atlanta Crackers players
Baltimore Orioles (IL) players
Louisville Colonels (minor league) players
Habana players
Major League Baseball outfielders
Major League Baseball players from Cuba
Cuban expatriate baseball players in the United States
Marianao players
Minneapolis Millers (baseball) players
Minor league baseball managers
Philadelphia Athletics players
Washington Senators (1901–1960) players
People from Bauta, Cuba
Dayton Aviators players